DXGM (1125 AM) Super Radyo is a radio station owned and operated by GMA Network. The stations studio is located at GMA Network Complex, Shrine Hills, Matina, Davao City, while its transmitter is located in Ma-a, Davao City.

References

Super Radyo stations
Radio stations in Davao City
News and talk radio stations in the Philippines
Radio stations established in 1997